The Tucson Gay Museum maintains an extensive collection of archival materials, artifacts and graphic arts relating to the history of LGBT people in the United States, with a focus on the LGBT communities of Tucson, Arizona and Phoenix, Arizona.
It became a member of the Arizona LGBTQIA+ Archives in 2020.

History
The Tucson Gay Museum effort began June 10, 1967 as a Gay and Lesbian history archiving project in Tucson, Arizona acquiring local Gay and Lesbian historical items, photographs of LGBTQ+ people places and events, posters and flyers of groups events, archiving Gay & Lesbian publications, recording events and community members memories, archiving historical items. Exhibit items relate to Arizona cities including Phoenix, Tucson, other Arizona cities and some major cities in the United States including those in Alaska, California, Hawaii, Texas, Washington State and Washington D.C.

Archives collections contain original photographs and archival records from the 1800s to 2020s chronicling the beginnings of Phoenix and Tucson Gay and Lesbian groups, political efforts, organizations, bars history, clubs, Gay bath houses, Drag Queen Performers, original non-political 1950s and later 'Gay' Pride celebrations parades efforts marches and events, Anti-Gay Hate Crimes & Murders, protests, Community Centers, Youth Groups, AIDS Organizations, Business Leagues, and those who made up those Communities.

Tucson Gay Museum is currently one of the museums and historical archives collections within the Arizona LGBTQ+ Museum. Museum historical preservation projects include production of LGBTQ+ related historical video and movie documentaries.

Traveling Phoenix Tucson LGBTQ+ Memories Projects And Related Exhibits
The Tucson LGBTQ+ ( Gay Lesbian Bisexual Transgender Queer + Memories Project ) maintains various traveling historical exhibits displays which have been exhibited in locations such as Tucson, Phoenix, the University of Arizona, Washington D.C., The National LGBTQ Museum , local and state groups, and various other venues. Some of the Tucson LGBTQ+ Memories Project's traveling mobile historical exhibits displays include:
 Tucson LGBTQ+ Memories Project
 Memorium Wall of Remembrance
 Tucson Gay Hate Crimes Murder Victims Memorial Project
 Phoenix AIDS Service Groups History Exhibits
 Phoenix Gay & Lesbian Bars History Exhibits
 Phoenix Gay Hate Crime Murders Memorium Exhibits 1970's-2000's
 Phoenix Pride Events & Organizations History Exhibits
 Phoenix LGBTQ+ Organizations History
 Phoenix LGBTQ+ Places Memorial Project Exhibits
 Tucson AIDS Service Groups History Archives
 Tucson Gay & Lesbian Bars History Exhibits
 Tucson Pride Events & Organizations History Exhibits
 Tucson LGBTQ+ Organizations History
 Tucson Gay Hate Crime Murders Memorium Exhibits 1970's-2014
 Tucson LGBTQ+ Memorial Project Exhibits

References

External links
 

1967 establishments in Arizona
LGBT culture in Arizona
Virtual museums
LGBT organizations in the United States
LGBT in Arizona
Organizations based in Tucson, Arizona
LGBT museums and archives